Kuusisto is a Finnish surname. As of 2013, there are more than 10,000 Finnish people registered with this surname.

Notable people
Some notable people with this surname include:
 Ilkka Kuusisto (born 1933), Finnish composer of popular opera
 Jarmo Kuusisto (born 1961), Finnish ice hockey player
 Jaakko Kuusisto (1974—2022), Finnish violinist and composer, son of Ilkka Kuusisto
 Jesse-Juho Kuusisto (born 1991), Finnish football player 
 Mika Kuusisto (born 1967), Finnish cross country skier
 Pekka Kuusisto (born 1976), Finnish violinist, son of Ilkka Kuusisto
 Stephen Kuusisto (born 1955), American poet
 Taneli Kuusisto (1905–1988), Finnish composer, music critic, teacher and choir leader
 Timo Kuusisto (born 1959), Finnish pole vaulter

References

Finnish-language surnames